Walter Delves (17 February 1891 – 27 May 1955) was an Australian cricketer. He played one first-class cricket match for Victoria in 1912.

See also
 List of Victoria first-class cricketers

References

External links
 

1891 births
1955 deaths
Australian cricketers
Victoria cricketers
Cricketers from Melbourne